JAM is a Canadian television show that has aired on TFO since 2012 and is produced by Groupe Fair-Play. The series focuses on French Canadian comedian Patrick Groulx and seven French speaking singer-songwriters from Ontario between the ages of 15 and 24 years old.

Description 

Over the series, the aim is to bring the seven young emerging Franco-Ontarian musicians to the Francofolies de Montréal, where they will perform on the biggest francophone stage in North America. The programme has aired three series on TFO since September 2012.

It is presented in the format of 10 episodes, each episode focuses on one of the musicians and their prospective music careers. The last three episodes are filmed behind the scenes while the young musicians prepare for their live performance at the Francofolies. The live show features an original song by each of the seven musicians and ends with a group song. According to fairplay, the official producers, the show is described as such: "JAM features a group of young artists from the next generation of Franco-Ontarian singer-songwriters. Hosted by Patrick Groulx, JAM is part road trip, part musical bootcamp and mentorship program for up-and-coming musicians as they work and play their way to their first big onstage gig at Montreal’s FrancoFolies."

The series is filled with comedy as host Patrick Groulx sets challenges for the young musicians such as writing a song in five minutes whilst putting up with ridiculous distractions, singing an original song in a bizarre location, or showing up to a radio studio without notifying the host. At the end of the series, the seven musicians have three days to put together a live performance under the artistic direction of Edgar Bori and the participation of already successful house-band Pat Groulx et les Bas Blancs.

The program will return for a consecutive third season with young emerging musicians Anika-France Forget, Céleste Lévis, Jade Bernier, Mariam Mishriki, Max Nolet, Erika Lamon and Patrick Godin.

List of musicians

Series 1 
 Gabrielle Goulet, Bourget
 Stéphanie Aubertin, Sturgeon Falls
 Anne Berniquez, Saint-Isidore
 Sarah Cruzoë, Orléans
 William Lamoureux, Gatineau-Ottawa
 Akeem Ouellet, Mattawa
 Philippe St-Arnaud, Cornwall

Series 2 
 James Zhao, Toronto
 Vanessa Thibodeau, Dubreuilville
 Raymond Piette, Hearst
 Venessa Lachance, Hearst
 Victoria Powell, Ottawa
 Yaovi Hoyi (YAO), Ottawa
 Philippe Brown et Michel Campeau, Ottawa

Series 3 
 Céleste Lévis, Timmins
 Erika Lamon, Elizabethtown-Kitley
 Jade Bernier, Angus
 Mariam Mishriki, Toronto
 Patrick Godin, Sudbury
 Maxime Nolet, Ottawa
 Anika-France Forget, Ottawa

References 

5.http://www.fairplayweb.com/en/productions/jam/

External links 
 Official Site 

TFO original programming
2010s Canadian reality television series
2010s Canadian music television series
2012 Canadian television series debuts
2014 Canadian television series endings